2010 European Artistic Gymnastics Championships may refer to:

2010 European Men's Artistic Gymnastics Championships
2010 European Women's Artistic Gymnastics Championships